Western Visayas (or Kanlurang Visayas) is an administrative region in the Philippines, numerically designated as Region VI. It consists of six provinces (Aklan, Antique, Capiz, Guimaras, Iloilo and Negros Occidental) and two highly urbanized cities (Bacolod and Iloilo City). The regional center is Iloilo City. The region is dominated by the native speakers of four Visayan languages: Hiligaynon, Kinaray-a, Aklanon and Capiznon.

On May 29, 2015, the region was realigned, when Western Visayas (Region VI) lost both the province of Negros Occidental and the highly urbanized city of Bacolod to the newly formed Negros Island Region. However, the region was dissolved, resulting in the return of Negros Occidental and Bacolod to Western Visayas Region on August 9, 2017.

Etymology
The region's current name is in reference to its geographic position in the greater Visayas area.

History

Regions first came into existence on September 24, 1972, when the provinces of the Philippines were organized into 11 regions by Presidential Decree No. 1 as part of the Integrated Reorganization Plan by President Ferdinand Marcos. The provinces of Aklan, Antique, Capiz, Iloilo (including its then-subprovince of Guimaras), and Negros Occidental were grouped together to form the Western Visayas region.

The province of Palawan was transferred to Region VI (Western Visayas) on May 23, 2005, by Executive Order 429. The Department of the Interior and Local Government announced in June 2005 that the transfer had been completed.
However, Palaweños criticized the move, citing a lack of consultation, with most residents in Puerto Princesa City and all municipalities but one preferring to stay with Region IV-B. Consequently, Administrative Order No. 129 was issued on August 19, 2005, to address this backlash. This Order directed the abeyance of Executive Order 429 pending the approval of an implementation plan for the orderly transfer of Palawan from Region IV-B to Region VI.
Hence, Palawan is currently still part of Region IV-B.

By virtue of Executive Order No. 183 issued on May 29, 2015, by President Benigno Aquino III, the province of Negros Occidental and its capital, Bacolod, were both removed from Western Visayas in order to form the Negros Island Region along with Negros Oriental. But later regained Negros Occidental and its capital, Bacolod City back into Western Visayas on August 9, 2017, when President Rodrigo Duterte dissolved the Negros Island Region, revoking Executive Order No. 183, s. 2015 through the signage of Executive Order No. 38, citing the reason of the lack of funds to fully establish the NIR according to Benjamin Diokno, the Secretary of Budget and Management.

Geography
Western Visayas consists of the major island of Panay and the smaller Guimaras, as well as several outlying islands. It also includes the western half of the larger island of Negros. The region is bordered to the north by the Sibuyan Sea, northeast by the Visayan Sea, east by the province of Negros Oriental in Central Visayas, south by the Iloilo Strait and the Panay Gulf, and west by the Sulu Sea.

Administrative divisions

Provinces
Western Visayas consists of 6 provinces, 2 highly urbanized cities, 14 component cities, 117 municipalities and 4,051 barangays.

Governors and vice governors

Cities

Demographics

Languages

The native languages of Western Visayas are:
 Aklanon/Akeanon, spoken in Aklan and northwestern Capiz.
 Capiznon, spoken in Capiz, northeastern Iloilo, and eastern Aklan.
 Cebuano, spoken in northeastern Negros Occidental.
 Hiligaynon, spoken in Iloilo, Negros Occidental, Guimaras, Capiz, Antique, and Aklan. It is the regional lingua franca.
 Kinaray-a, spoken in Antique, southwestern half of Iloilo, Guimaras, western Capiz, and southwestern Aklan.
 Malaynon, spoken in northwestern Aklan including Boracay Island.
 Caluyanon, spoken in the Semirara Islands (Semirara, Caluya, and Sibay Islands).

Economy

Transportation

Airports

International
 Kalibo International Airport
 Iloilo International Airport

Domestic
 Bacolod–Silay Airport (Silay City, Negros Occidental  )
 Godofredo P. Ramos Airport (Caticlan, Malay, Aklan)
 Roxas Airport (Roxas City, Capiz)
 Evelio Javier Airport (Funda-Dalipe, San Jose de Buenavista, Antique)

Municipal
 Semirara Airport (Semirara Island, Caluya, Antique)

Other
 Sipalay Airport (Sipalay, Negros Occidental)
 Kabankalan City Domestic Airport (Kabankalan, Negros Occidental)
 Sicogon Airport (Sicogon Island, Carles, Iloilo)
 Guimaras Airport (Buenavista, Guimaras)

Rail

Proposals to re-connect again Iloilo-Roxas, Iloilo-Kalibo, Iloilo-Malay (Aklan) and Iloilo-San Jose (Antique) from the Iloilo City via rail was included in the revival of the currently defunct Panay Railways network which has a station in Santa Barbara town proper.

References

External links 
 
 
 

 
Regions of the Philippines
Visayas
Sulu Sea
1972 establishments in the Philippines